The 2005 Open de Moselle was a men's tennis tournament played on indoor hard courts. It was the third edition of the Open de Moselle, and was part of the International Series of the 2005 ATP Tour. It took place at the Arènes de Metz in Metz, France, from 3 October until 9 October 2005. Third-seeded Ivan Ljubičić won the singles title.

Finals

Singles

 Ivan Ljubičić defeated  Gaël Monfils 7–6(9–7), 6–0
It was Ljubičić's 1st title of the year, and his 2nd overall.

Doubles

 Michaël Llodra /  Fabrice Santoro defeated  José Acasuso /  Sebastián Prieto 5–2, 3–5, 5–4(7–4)
It was Llodra's 2nd title of the year, and the 7th of his career. It was Santoro's 2nd title of the year, and the 16th of his career.

References

External links
 Official website
 ATP tournament profile
 ITF tournament edition details

2005 ATP Tour
2005 in French tennis
 
October 2005 sports events in France